The 2015 IHF Super Globe was the ninth edition. It was held at the Duhail Handball Sports Hall in Doha, Qatar from 7–10 September 2015.

Füchse Berlin captured their first title by defeating MKB Veszprém in the final.

Teams
Eight teams participated.

Results
All times are local (UTC+3).

Bracket

5th place bracket

Quarterfinals

5–8th place semifinals

Semifinals

Seventh place game

Fifth place game

Third place game

Final

Final ranking

References

External links
Official website

2015
IHF Super Globe
IHF Super Globe
2015 IHF Super Globe
Sports competitions in Doha